Muswell Hillbillies is the tenth studio album by the English rock group the Kinks. Released in November 1971, it was the band's first album for RCA Records. The album is named after the Muswell Hill area of North London, where band leader Ray Davies and guitarist Dave Davies grew up and the band formed in the early 1960s.

The album introduces a number of working class figures and the stresses with which they must contend. It did not sell well but received critical acclaim and lasting fan appreciation.

Recording 
Muswell Hillbillies was the band's first album for RCA Records, their prior recordings having been released on Pye Records (Reprise Records in the United States). Their contract with Pye/Reprise expired the same year. The album was recorded between August and October 1971
at Morgan Studios, London, using a new brass section, the Mike Cotton Sound, which included Mike Cotton on trumpet, John Beecham on trombone and tuba, and Alan Holmes on clarinet.

Reception 

The album was not a commercial success (it failed to chart in the United Kingdom and peaked at #100 in the U.S.), and its sales were a disappointment following the success of Lola the previous year. Stereo Review magazine called the poor-selling record "album of the year" in 1972 (even though it was released on 24 November 1971). In the 1984 Rolling Stone Album Guide, Rolling Stone editors gave the album five stars out of five and called it Davies' "signature statement" as a songwriter. In a retrospective review for AllMusic, Stephen Thomas Erlewine called the album a wide-ranging collection of Ray Davies compositions which focus on the tensions and frustrations of modern life.

Re-releases
A remastered deluxe edition of Muswell Hillbillies was released in the UK on 7 October 2013, with several bonus tracks, alternate takes, and BBC recordings all remastered by Andrew Sandoval and Dan Hersch. On 10 November 2014, a Legacy Edition was released for the United States, with disc 1 containing the remastered stereo album, and many of the UK Deluxe Edition bonus tracks remastered by Vic Anesini, while the second disc is a DVD with promotional TV performances (previously released in the UK on The Kinks At The BBC box set) from the era.

Artwork 
The front cover picture was taken by Rod Shone in the Archway Tavern, a pub in Archway (more than two miles away from Muswell Hill). The back inset picture, showing the band below a signpost giving directions to Muswell Hill, was taken on the small traffic island at the intersection of Castle Yard and Southwood Lane in Highgate.

Track listing

Personnel 
Track numbering refers to CD and digital releases of the album.

The Kinks
 Ray Davies – lead vocals, acoustic guitar, resonator guitar
 Dave Davies – lead guitar, slide guitar, banjo, backing vocals
 John Dalton – bass guitar, backing vocals
 Mick Avory – drums, percussion
 John Gosling – piano (acoustic and electric), Hammond organ, accordion

Additional personnel
 Mike Cotton – trumpet
 John Beecham – trombone, tuba
 Alan Holmes – saxophone, clarinet
 Vicki Brown – backing vocals on tracks 4 and 9
 Ken Jones – harmonica on track 7
 Mike Bobak – engineer
Richard Edwards – engineer

References 

The Kinks albums
1971 albums
RCA Records albums
Albums produced by Ray Davies
Albums recorded at Morgan Sound Studios
Country rock albums by English artists
Concept albums
Muswell Hill